José Gragera Amado (born 14 May 2000) is a Spanish footballer who plays as a central midfielder for RCD Espanyol.

Club career
Gragera was born in Gijón, Asturias, and joined Sporting de Gijón's youth setup in 2008, from La Asunción CF. On 24 January 2018, while still a youth, he signed a professional three-year deal with the club.

Gragera made his senior debut with the reserves on 16 December 2017, coming on as a late substitute for Pedro Díaz in a 1–0 Segunda División B away win against Arenas Club de Getxo. He scored his first goal the following 14 October, netting the second in a 2–0 win at CD Izarra.

Gragera made his first team debut on 8 June 2019, again replacing Díaz in a 1–0 home defeat of Cádiz CF in the Segunda División. He scored his first professional goal on 20 September 2020, netting the game's only in an away success over FC Cartagena.

On 31 January 2023, Gragera signed a five-and-a-half-year contract with La Liga side RCD Espanyol.

References

External links
Profile at the RCD Espanyol website

2000 births
Living people
Footballers from Gijón
Spanish footballers
Association football midfielders
La Liga players
Segunda División players
Segunda División B players
Sporting de Gijón B players
Sporting de Gijón players
RCD Espanyol footballers
Spain youth international footballers
Spain under-21 international footballers